Höfen or Hoefen can be:

Austria
 Höfen, Tyrol, a municipality in the district of Reutte in Tyrol

Germany
 Höfen an der Enz, a town in the district of Calw, Baden-Württemberg
 Höfen, Gummersbach, a village in the municipality of Gummersbach, Bergisches Land, North Rhine-Westphalia
 Höfen, Monschau, a borough (former village) of Monschau, Aachen District, North Rhine-Westphalia
 Höfen, Stegaurach, a village in the municipality of Stegaurach, Bavaria
 Höfen, Meinersen, a village in the municipality of Meinersen, Lower Saxony

Switzerland
 Höfen, Thun, a municipality (commune) in Thun, in Canton of Bern

See also
 Hofen (disambiguation)